Big Brother 2 is the second season of the Croatian reality television series Big Brother that premiered on 4 September to 30 December 2005, and ran for 118 days.

Season summary
The second season had radical changes in the format of the show — the number of contestants was initially raised from 12 to 14; the pace of evictions and nominations was accelerated, and numbers of contestants were introduced at later stages.

The composition of contestants was different—they were much younger, less educated and generally perceived to be less mature. They also tended to represent various sections of the Croatian population, missing in the previous season. This was most evident with Matko Okmažić from Omiš, the 25-year-old son of the restaurant owner, later revealed to be the candidate of far-right parties at local elections. Okmažić, although popular with contestants, outraged many liberal Croatians with his chauvinist views and later had to publicly apologize after singing "Jasenovac i Gradiška Stara", the controversial song of Croatian far-right singer Joško Tomičić. He outraged feminist and gays rights groups after a statement that he would kill his girlfriend if he found out she is cheating on him. In 2001 local elections for Omiš city council he was 14th on the list for HB/HKDU hard right coalition.

Despite this, Okmažić gradually evolved as the front-runner for the prize. He never got nominated and was part of the unofficial clan of self-declared "finalists". One of those was Hamdija Seferović, the only Roma contestant in the show. Mild-mannered and soft-spoken Seferović gradually won many sympathies among Croatian public, first by publicly admitting his lack of primary education, then by cultivating the image of a dedicated family man.

Because of this, the actual finals proved to be quite unpredictable. This was also due to Daca Bosančić, the candidate who entered finals despite her female gender, the status of a replacement candidate. In the end, Seferović finished first and Bosančić finished second.

This result was often perceived as the victory of liberal-minded and pro-European Croatians over the right-wingers embodied in Matko Okmažić.

The second season, just like first, also had its share of criticism—mostly due to lack of creativity among producers — but surprisingly the rating was higher than the first seasons. There were also complaints about bet shops influencing the ultimate result by publishing low odds for evictees early in the week and many conspiracy theories about huge bets being used as a tool for manipulations.

Nominations Table

Notes

: There were no nominations this week, and all housemates automatically faced the public vote.
: As a new housemate, Hana was exempt from the nominations process this week.
: As new housemates, Daca, Dominik, Matea, and Željka were exempt from the nominations process this week.
: As new housemates, Maroje and Tatjana were exempt from the nominations process this week. Kristian automatically faced the public vote due to not fully participating in a task.
: This week, the public were voting for a winner, rather than to evict.

References 

2005 Croatian television seasons
Big Brother (Croatian TV series)
Croatia